The Latin word imperator derives from the stem of the verb , meaning 'to order, to command'. It was originally employed as a title roughly equivalent to commander under the Roman Republic. Later it became a part of the titulature of the Roman Emperors as their praenomen. The English word emperor derives from   imperator via . The Roman emperors themselves generally based their authority on multiple titles and positions, rather than preferring any single title. Nevertheless, imperator was used relatively consistently as an element of a Roman ruler's title throughout the Principate and the Dominate.

Imperatores in the ancient Roman Kingdom
When Rome was ruled by kings,
to be able to rule, the king had to be invested with the full regal authority and power.  So, after the comitia curiata, held to elect the king, the king also had to be conferred the imperium.

Imperatores in the Roman Republic
In Roman Republican literature and epigraphy, an imperator was a magistrate with imperium. But also, mainly in the later Roman Republic and during the late Republican civil wars, imperator was the honorific title assumed by certain military commanders.  After an especially great victory, an army's troops in the field would proclaim their commander imperator, an acclamation necessary for a general to apply to the Senate for a triumph. After being acclaimed imperator, the victorious general had a right to use the title after his name until the time of his triumph, where he would relinquish the title as well as his imperium.

Since a triumph was the goal of many politically ambitious Roman commanders, Roman Republican history is full of cases where legions were bribed to call their commander imperator. The title of imperator was given in 90 BC to Lucius Julius Caesar, in 84 BC to Gnaeus Pompeius Magnus, in 60 BC to Gaius Julius Caesar, relative of the previously mentioned Lucius Julius Caesar, in the 50s to Gaius Julius Caesar (in Gaul), in 45 BC again to Gaius Julius Caesar, in 43 BC to Decimus Junius Brutus, and in 41 BC to Lucius Antonius (younger brother and ally of the more famous Marcus Antonius). In 15 AD Germanicus was also imperator during the empire (see below) of his adoptive father Tiberius.

Imperator as an imperial title

After Augustus established the Roman Empire, the title imperator was generally restricted to the emperor, though in the early years of the empire it would occasionally be granted to a member of his family.  As a permanent title, imperator was used as a praenomen by the Roman emperors and was taken on accession.  After the reign of Tiberius, the act of being proclaimed imperator was transformed into the act of imperial accession.  In fact, if a general was acclaimed by his troops as imperator, it would be tantamount to a declaration of rebellion against the ruling emperor.  At first the term continued to be used in the Republican sense as a victory title but attached to the de facto monarch and head of state, rather than the actual military commander. The title followed the emperor's name along with the number of times he was acclaimed as such, for example IMP V ("imperator five times").  In time it became the title of the de facto monarch, pronounced upon (and synonymous with) their assumption.

As a title imperator was generally translated into Greek as autokrator ("one who rules himself," also sometimes used as a translation for Roman dictators).  This was necessarily imprecise as it lost the nuances of Latin political thought contrasting imperium with other forms of public authority.  Nevertheless, this title (along with sebastos for augustus) was used in Greek-language texts for Roman emperors from the establishment of the empire.

In the east, the title continued to be used into the Byzantine period, though to a lesser, and much more ceremonial, extent. In most Byzantine writings, the Greek translation "Autokrator" is preferred, but "Imperator" makes an appearance in Constantine IV's mid 7th century mosaic in the Basilica of Sant'Apollinare in Classe, and on various 9th century lead seals.

Use in East Rome and other post-Roman states

After the Roman empire collapsed in the West in the 5th century, Latin continued to be used as the official language of the Eastern Roman Empire. The Roman emperors of this period (historiographically referred to as  Byzantine emperors) were referred to as imperatores in Latin texts, while the word basileus (king) and autokrator (emperor) were used in Greek.

After 800, the imperator was used (in conjunction with augustus) as a formal Latin title in succession by the Carolingian and German Holy Roman Emperors until 1806 and by the Austrian Emperors until 1918.

In medieval Spain, the title imperator was used under a variety of circumstances from the ninth century onwards, but its usage peaked, as a formal and practical title, between 1086 and 1157. It was primarily used by the Kings of León and Castile, but it also found currency in the Kingdom of Navarre and was employed by the Counts of Castile and at least one Duke of Galicia. It signalled at various points the king's equality with the Byzantine Emperor and Holy Roman Emperor, his rule by conquest or military superiority, his rule over several people groups ethnic or religious, and his claim to suzerainty over the other kings of the peninsula, both Christian and Muslim.

Beginning in 1077 Alfonso instituted the use of the style ego Adefonsus imperator totius Hispaniae ("I, Alfonso, emperor of all Spain") and its use soon became regular. This title was used throughout the period 1079–81, which represents the peak of his imperial pretensions before his capture of the city of Toledo, ancient capital of the Visigoths. In 1080 he introduced the form ego Adefonsus Hispaniarum imperator ("I, Alfonso, emperor of the Spains"), which he used again in 1090. His most elaborate imperial title was ego Adefonsus imperator totius Castelle et Toleto necnon et Nazare seu Alave ("I, Alfonso, emperor of all Castile and of Toledo also and of Nájera, or Álava").

After the Ottoman Empire conquered both the Balkan peninsula (Rumeli in Turkish meaning "lands of Rome") and Constantinople, the Turkish ruler acclaimed himself Caesar of Rome (sultan-ı iklim-i Rûm). In the 15th century Bayezid II established diplomatic relations with some Christian European states, and sent a document to the King of Poland in which he used the titles Sultan Dei gratia Asie, Grecie etc. İmperator Maximus ("with help of God, emperor of Asia and Greece"). Like his predecessor, Selim I titled himself imperator in diplomatic correspondence (per la Divina favente clementia Grande Imperator di Constantinopoli, di Asia, Europa, Persia, Syria et Egypto et Arabia et de li mari etc.) due to his military successes.

Imperatrix
The term imperatrix seems not to have been used in Ancient Rome to indicate the consort of an imperator or later of an Emperor. In the early years of the Roman Empire there was no standard title or honorific for the Emperor's wife, even the "Augusta" honorific was rather exceptionally granted, and not exclusively to wives of living emperors.

It is not clear when the feminine form of the Latin term imperator originated or was used for the first time. It usually indicates a reigning monarch, and is thus used in the Latin version of titles of modern reigning Empresses.

Likewise, when Fortuna is qualified "imperatrix mundi" in the Carmina Burana there's no implication of any type of consort — the term describes (the Goddess or personified) Fortune "ruling the world".

In Christian context, Imperatrix became a laudatory address to the Virgin Mary, in diverse forms at least since the Middle Ages — for example, she is sometimes called "Imperatrix angelorum" ("ruler of the angels").

Derivatives
Imperator is the root of most Romance languages's word for emperor. It is the root of the English word "emperor", which entered the language via the French empereur, while related adjectives like "imperial" were imported into English directly from Latin.

References

Bibliography 
  489 p.
  514 p. (Biblioteca virtual at http://ifc.dpz.es).

Ancient Roman titles
Military ranks of ancient Rome
Military awards and decorations of ancient Rome
Latin political words and phrases